The Gettysburg and Northern Railroad  is a short-line railroad located in the U.S. state of Pennsylvania. The Gettysburg and Northern Railroad is owned by Pioneer Lines.

Operations
Between Gettysburg and Mount Holly Springs, the railroad serves Biglerville, Aspers, Gardners, Peach Glen, Hunters Run, and Upper Mill. The Gettysburg and Northern Railroad interchanges with CSX Transportation in Gettysburg and the Norfolk Southern Railway in Mount Holly Springs. Among the products carried by the railroad are canned goods, pulpboard, soda ash, grain, and scrap paper. The Gettysburg and Northern Railroad is owned by railroad holding company Pioneer Lines.

History
The railroad was built in the late 19th century and opened in 1891 as the Gettysburg and Harrisburg Railway. The line was later leased to the Reading Railroad and operated as the "Gettysburg Branch." The bankrupt Reading Railroad became part of Conrail in 1976, however the Gettysburg Branch was left out of the Conrail system. The Pennsylvania Department of Transportation took over the branch and sold the line to a new company, the Blairsville & Indiana Railroad, in 1976; this company changed its name to Gettysburg Railroad.

As of January 2023, the Gettysburg and Northern is owned and operated by Patriot Rail  

 In 1996, the Gettysburg Railroad was sold to RailAmerica subsidiary Delaware Valley Railroad Company, which operated the line as the Gettysburg Railway. In 2001, the Gettysburg Railway was sold to Pioneer Railcorp and the Gettysburg and Northern Railroad took over operations.

References

External links

Pennsylvania railroads
Pioneer Lines
Railway companies established in 2001